Francisco José Rojas Gutiérrez (born 15 September 1944) is a Mexican politician affiliated with the Institutional Revolutionary Party. As of 2014 he served as Deputy of the LIX and LXI Legislatures of the Mexican Congress as a plurinominal representative.

From 2012 to 2014 he was the director of the Comisión Federal de Electricidad.

References

1944 births
Living people
Politicians from Mexico City
National Autonomous University of Mexico alumni
Members of the Chamber of Deputies (Mexico)
Institutional Revolutionary Party politicians
21st-century Mexican politicians
Deputies of the LIX Legislature of Mexico
Deputies of the LXI Legislature of Mexico